The Peru Billie Jean King Cup team represents Peru in the Billie Jean King Cup tennis competition and are governed by the Federación de Tenis de Peru.  They currently compete in the Americas Zone Group II.

History
Peru competed in its first Fed Cup in 1982.  Their best result was reaching the round of 16 in their debut year.

See also
Fed Cup
Peru Davis Cup team

External links

Billie Jean King Cup teams
Fed Cup
Fed Cup